The London Regatta Centre (now formally known as Royal Docks Watersports Centre) is a rowing and dragon boat racing centre located in the Docklands area in the East End of London.  It is built at the west end on the northern quayside of the historic Royal Albert Dock directly opposite London City Airport. The site is owned by the Royal Albert Dock Trust, and is home to the Queen Mary, University of London Boat Club, London Youth Rowing, Curlew Rowing Club, London Otters Rowing Club, University of East London Boat Club, Raging Dragons Dragon Boat Club, Thames Dragons, Wave Walkers, Windy Pandas DBC and Typhoon DBC amongst others.

The Regatta Centre was opened formally in March 2000 by the Princess Royal. The building was designed by Ian Ritchie Architects. The 200-year lease on the land for the centre was to the Royal Albert Dock Trust, by the London Docklands Development Corporation.

The centre has a 2,000 metre course, with seven lanes plus a return lane. The existing 1,750-metre length of the dock was extended to 2,000 by the removal and replacement of the Woolwich Manor Way Bridge at the east of the dock. The new bridge was built further east and is now officially known as the Sir Steve Redgrave Bridge. Amongst the centre's other facilities are a rowing tank and a boathouse

The centre is near Royal Albert Docklands Light Railway station.

See also
Rowing on the River Thames

References

External links
Official website

Rowing venues in the United Kingdom
Sports venues in London
Water sports in London